Boophis laurenti is a species of frog in the family Mantellidae.
It is endemic to Madagascar, known only from Andringitra National Park.
Its natural habitats are subtropical or tropical moist montane forests, subtropical or tropical high-altitude shrubland, subtropical or tropical high-altitude grassland, and rivers.
It is threatened by habitat loss for fires and livestock grazing.

References

laurenti
Endemic frogs of Madagascar
Taxa named by Jean Marius René Guibé
Amphibians described in 1947
Taxonomy articles created by Polbot